Rytidosperma racemosum or wallaby grass, is a species of grass found in New Zealand and southern and eastern Australia. A widespread plant, it is found in many parts of Australia, apart from the most arid sites. The specific epithet racemosa is  derived from the Latin for bearing racemes.

Two varieties are recognized: 
 Rytidosperma racemosum var. racemosum
 Rytidosperma racemosum var. obtusatum

References

racemosum
Bunchgrasses of Australasia
Grasses of New Zealand
Poales of Australia
Plants described in 1979